The , more formally known as the , is a style of formal court dress first worn in the Heian period by noble women and ladies-in-waiting at the Japanese Imperial Court. The  was composed of a number of kimono-like robes, layered on top of each other, with the outer robes cut both larger and thinner to reveal the layered garments underneath.

Despite the name, the  varied in its exact number of layers. The number of layers, and the type of layers, could alter the formality of a  outfit, with some accessories, such as overcoats and a long, skirt-like train (known as the ) only worn for special, formal occasions.

These colour combinations, referred to by names that reflected their corresponding season of wear, did not faithfully reproduce the exact colours of nature, but were instead intended to reproduce a feeling of the season.

The  first appeared some time around the 10th century; however, by the Kamakura period, the number of layers worn by aristocratic ladies, even in court, had been reduced heavily.

Components, colours, and accessories

layers
The term  is the common, retroactively-applied name used for women's layered court clothing in Heian period Japan, rather than acting as the formal name for the set of clothes and accessories worn together. Each layer consisted of silk garments, with the innermost garment (the ) being made of plain white silk, followed by other layers in different colours and silk fabrics. The outfit could be finished with the addition of a final layer or, for formal occasions, a coat and train.

Due to this weight, movement could be difficult. Layers could be shed or kept, depending on the season and the night temperatures. By the Muromachi period, however, the number of layers of the dress had reduced considerably.

The layers of the  consist of:

 The undergarments, not considered part of the  proper: typically a two-piece cotton or silk garment.
 The : a short red or white silk robe of ankle or lower calf length.
 The : the formal version of  worn by noble women; a very long pleated red skirt, sewn with two split legs.
 The : an unlined silk robe; usually red, white or blue-green, although other colors (such as dark red-violet or dark green) very rarely occur.
 The : a scarlet beaten silk robe worn as a stiffener and support for the outer robes.
The colour and fabric used for the  indicate the rank of the wearer.
 The : a waist-length Chinese style jacket.
 The : an apron-like train skirt, worn trailing down the back of the robe. White with dyed or embroidered adornment.

Colours and layered colours
The only place where the layers were truly discernable was around the sleeves, the hems of the garment, and the neck, though in summer, sheer fabrics were worn to create new colour effects through the layers. During the Heian period, a woman sat hidden behind a  screen with only the lower part of the body and sleeve edges visible to an outsider. Therefore, the layers of colours were used to represent the woman herself, and the arrangements of the layers and their colours were a good indication to an outsider what taste and what rank the lady had.

The colour combinations, termed , were given poetic names referring to the flora and fauna of the season, such as "crimson plum of the spring", though they did not necessarily reproduce these colours exactly; a set named "under the snow" had layer of green representing leaves, layers of pink, with white on top to represent snow. The colour combinations changed with the seasons and occasions, with it being fashionable to change one's gowns just before the turn of the season. The appropriate use of these colours, and the point at which one changed one's robes, gave an indication of the cultured and refined taste of the wearer.

Apart from their robes, Japanese court ladies of the Heian era also wore their hair very long, only cut at the sides of their faces in a layered fashion, with the longer hair sometimes worn tied back.

Accessories
This was used by women not only to cool down, but also as an important communication device; since women at the Heian period court were not allowed to speak face-to-face to male outsiders, a woman could hold her sleeve up or use her opened fan to shield herself from inquiring looks.

Communication with potential suitors was generally conducted with women sat behind a  blind, with the suitor only able to see the sleeves – and thus the layers – of her . This practice was prominent during the Heian period, and was described in the Tale of Genji.

Contemporary use 

Today, the  can normally only be seen in museums, movies, costume demonstrations, tourist attractions or at certain festivals.

During the wedding of Empress Masako to the crown prince, the Empress wore  for the official ceremony. The  was also worn by Empress Michiko during the enthronement ceremony of Emperor Akihito in 1990. For the 2019 enthronement of Emperor Naruhito, the women of the Imperial family and their ladies-in-waiting all wore , while the Emperor, Crown Prince Akishino, and their gentlemen-in-waiting all wore .

The  held every year in Meiwa, Mie showcases Heian period dress.

References

External links 

Images of a 
Gallery of  images
Reference chart of  colour schemes (note: incomplete with some translation errors, but includes  and  colours)
Reference chart of  colour schemes (note: complete, but written in Japanese characters and without  colour information)
Glossary

Japanese full-body garments
Robes and cloaks
Court uniforms and dress
Women in Japan
Japanese words and phrases